Karl Laas (17 April 1908 – 28 December 1967) was an Estonian long-distance runner. He competed in the marathon at the 1928 Summer Olympics.

References

External links
 

1908 births
1967 deaths
Sportspeople from Tartu
People from the Governorate of Livonia
Athletes (track and field) at the 1928 Summer Olympics
Estonian male long-distance runners
Estonian male marathon runners
Olympic athletes of Estonia